Nobles' Land Bank was a bank operating in the Russian Empire founded in 1885. The bank was created to provide cheap loans to Russian landed nobility as the mortgages of their estates.

History 
The Nobles' Land Bank was founded in 1885 to maintain the land tenure of hereditary nobles. It was located in St. Petersburg, Admiralty Embankment, house 14.

The bank applied to the European part of the Russian Empire, excluding the Grand Principality Finland, the Kingdom of Polish, the Baltic province and the Transcaucasus. The loans were issued to landowners on the security of their land possessions in the amount of 60-75% of the value of land (including burdensome debts). The maximum period of repayment of the loan reached  48 years 4 months, but was later increased to 51 years, and then up to 66 years 6 months. In the 1880s the percentage paid on the loan was 5%-6%, and by 1897 it was reduced to 3.5%. Late payments were charged with 0.5 percent in the first two months and 1 percent in the next. In accordance with the Regulation of 26.6.1889 the estate could be appointed to auction, but in practice it was not applied.

In 1890, Bank's activities were extended to the Transcaucasus, in 1894 — to the Western province of the Empire.

In November 25 (December 8) of 1917 the Bank was abolished by the decree of the Council of People's Commissars of the RSFSR.

See also
Peasants' Land Bank

References

Defunct banks of Russia
Banks established in 1885
1885 establishments in the Russian Empire
Companies based in Saint Petersburg
Banks of the Russian Empire